Adam Thompson (born 28 July 1982) is a retired tennis player from New Zealand.

Thompson had a career high ATP singles ranking of 677 achieved on 23 August 2004. He also had a career high ATP doubles ranking of 597 achieved on 20 March 2006.

Thompson represented New Zealand at the Davis Cup, where he had a W/L record of 3–2.

ATP Challenger and ITF Futures finals

Singles: 1 (0–1)

Doubles: 7 (5–2)

References

External links
 
 
 

1982 births
Living people
New Zealand male tennis players
Sportspeople from Hastings, New Zealand